The following is a list of Wales national rugby union team results since the first match in 1881.	



Summary

Results

References

 
results